Maureen Cynthia Eager (24 November 1936 – 25 August 1996) was a Hong Kong freestyle swimmer. She competed in two events at the 1952 Summer Olympics.

References

External links
 

1936 births
1996 deaths
Hong Kong female freestyle swimmers
Olympic swimmers of Hong Kong
Swimmers at the 1952 Summer Olympics
Place of birth missing